Trichiurana is a monotypic moth genus in the family Lasiocampidae erected by Per Olof Christopher Aurivillius in 1921. Its single species, Trichiurana meridionalis, described by the same author in the same year, is found in what is now South Africa.

References

Endemic moths of South Africa
Lasiocampidae
Monotypic moth genera